The Forum Corporation is a learning and consulting company.

History

Early years
Forum was founded in 1971. Five partners, several of whom had recently graduated from Harvard Business School, they originally financed the startup with their American Express cards.  By 1982 it was ranked 362 on the Inc. 500 list of the fastest growing private companies in America, with 170 employees and 40 part-time instructors.  As clients moved, the company began conducting operations overseas in the late 1970s.

Acquisitions
On June 30, 2000, Forum accepted an offer by Pearson, a London-based media conglomerate, to purchase Forum for US$90 million (GBP 60 million) in cash.  Pearson intended to merge Forum with FT Knowledge to generate sales of US$110 million in its first year.  Forum Chairman and CEO John Humphrey oversaw the integration as chairman of an international advisory board while FT Knowledge CEO Pippa Wicks became the CEO of the new company. Forum executive vice president Jennifer Potter-Brotman was promoted to CEO of Forum, as Pearson wished to keep senior Forum managers and preserve brand identity. After Forum shareholders unanimously approved the purchase, and the Federal Trade Commission approved the deal on July 10, the official announcement was released August 3.

In July 2002, the Institute for International Research (IIR) expressed interest in purchasing Forum, and as FT Knowledge began consolidating Pearson decided to launch negotiations that November.  A final deal was signed on January 13, 2003, selling Forum to IIR for US$30 million.  IIR was purchased itself  in 2005 by the British publisher and conference company Informa.

In October 2013, Providence Equity Partners acquired Forum and four sister companies from Informa, and is now part of Providence Corporate Development Holding Company's business portfolio.  In 2015, Forum's parent company was renamed Twenty Eighty.

In 2015, Forum acquired Kenexa Insight from IBM  This offering was a research base built over 30 years of studying high performance.  This acquisition was the foundation of the Talent Analytics and Assessment service within the organization.

Business
Forum provides learning in three main areas: leadership, sales and sales management, and Talent Analytics and Talent Assessment .

References

Further reading
Griep, Elizabeth; Davis, Jocelyn; Fowler, Simon. (2010).  Forum's Principles of Learning: A Guidebook for Advancing Performance in Today's Workplace. 
Davis, Jocelyn R.; Frechette, Henry M. Jr.; Boswell, Edwin H. (2010). Strategic Speed: Mobilize People, Accelerate Execution.  Boston: Harvard Business Press. 
Smith, Shaun; Milligan, Andy (2002).  Uncommon Practice: People Who Deliver a Great Brand Experience. Financial Times Prentice Hall.  
Van Adelsberg, David; Trolley, Edward A. (1999). Running Training Like A Business: Delivering Unmistakable Value. San Francisco: Berrett-Koehler Publishers. 
Whiteley, Richard, Hessan, Diane  (1997). Customer-Centered Growth: Five Proven Strategies for Building Competitive Advantage. Basic Books. 

Companies based in Boston
Consulting firms established in 1971
International management consulting firms
1971 establishments in Massachusetts